Cerithium columna is a species of sea snail, a marine gastropod mollusk in the family Cerithiidae.

Description

Distribution
The distribution of Cerithium columna includes the Pacific Ocean.

References

External links

Cerithiidae
Gastropods described in 1834